Varhaug is a former municipality in Rogaland county, Norway.  The  municipality existed from 1894 until 1964.  The administrative centre of the municipality was the village of Varhaug where Varhaug Church is located.  The municipality encompassed the central part of the present-day Hå Municipality.  It included the villages of Varhaug and Vigrestad as well as the surrounding countryside.

History
The municipality of Varhaug was established in 1894 when the old municipality of Hå was divided into two municipalities: Nærbø (population: 1801) and Varhaug (population: 1806). On 1 January 1964, there were many major municipal mergers in Norway due to the work of the Schei Committee. On that date the three neighboring municipalities of Varhaug, Nærbø, and Ogna were all merged to form the municipality of Hå. The village of Varhaug became the administrative centre for the new, larger municipality. Prior to the merger, Varhaug municipality had a population of 3,454.

Government
All municipalities in Norway, including Varhaug, are responsible for primary education (through 10th grade), outpatient health services, senior citizen services, unemployment and other social services, zoning, economic development, and municipal roads.  The municipality is governed by a municipal council of elected representatives, which in turn elects a mayor.

Municipal council
The municipal council  of Varhaug was made up of 17 representatives that were elected to four year terms.  The party breakdown of the final municipal council was as follows:

See also
List of former municipalities of Norway

References

Hå
Former municipalities of Norway
1894 establishments in Norway
1964 disestablishments in Norway